A qubit is a quantum bit, a unit of quantum information — the quantum analogue of the classical bit.

Qubit may also refer to:

 Qubit (game show), a Canadian game show
 Qubit fluorometer, an instrument used for quantification of DNA, RNA, and protein

See also
 Quettabit (Qbit)
 Cubit (disambiguation)